2021 Emmy Awards may refer to:

 42nd Sports Emmy Awards, held on June 8, 2021, honoring sports programming.
 48th Daytime Emmy Awards, held on June 25, 2021, honoring daytime programming.
 73rd Primetime Emmy Awards, held on September 19, 2021, honoring primetime programming.
 42nd News & Documentary Emmy Awards, held on September 28–29, 2021, honoring news and documentary programming
 49th International Emmy Awards, held on November 22, 2021, honoring international programming.  

Emmy Award ceremonies by year